The 73rd New York Infantry Regiment was an infantry regiment of Union Army in the American Civil War. The regiment was organized in New York City in May 1861, originally under the designation the Fourth Excelsior Regiment, as a Zouave regiment, known for its unusual dress and drill style. The uniform worn by this regiment consisted of a dark blue chasseur jacket with light blue trim and light blue trefoils on each sleeve, sky blue chasseur trousers with two white stripes down each leg, brown leather gaiters, a light blue kepi with a dark blue band and dark blue piping, and a red Zouave fez with a blue tassel as a fatigue cap.  Drawn from the ranks of the city's many volunteer fire companies, the unit was known alternately as the Second Fire Zouaves, after the 11th New York was known as the First Fire Zouaves, and they were also known as the Excelsior Zouaves. Some of the men wore the brass letters "E Z" on the bands of their kepis.  Many artists have depicted this regiment also with red shirts with the collar sticking out over the jacket creating a "red collar."

The unit served in the Excelsior Brigade in several battles, including Antietam, Chancellorsville, Gettysburg, and Appomattox Courthouse.

Their monument at Gettysburg shows a statue of a volunteer fireman from the New York Fire Department, which was disbanded in 1865, standing hand-in-hand with a zouave of the 73rd New York Volunteer Infantry Regiment, wearing the uniform of their veteran's organization.

See also
 List of New York Civil War regiments

Notes

References
The Civil War Archives: Union Regimental Histories: New York
 Foner, Eric (1988). Reconstruction: America's Unfinished Revolution, 1863-1877. New York, New York: Harper & Row. .
 Smith, Robin (1996). American Civil War Zouaves. Westminster, Maryland: Osprey Publishing. .

External links
New York State Military Museum and Veterans Research Center - Civil War - 73rd Infantry Regiment

Infantry 073
Military history of New York City
Excelsior Brigade
1861 establishments in New York (state)
Military units and formations established in 1861
Military units and formations disestablished in 1865

Guide to the 73rd Regiment of the New York State Volunteers Records, 1861-1868